Dalow (also known as Dalī) is a village in Dul Rural District, in the Central District of Urmia County, West Azerbaijan Province, Iran. At the 2006 census, its population was 508, in 82 families.

References 

Populated places in Urmia County